Magness is a surname. Notable people with the surname include:

Bob Magness (1924–1996), American businessman
Clif Magness, American songwriter and record producer
Gary Magness, American businessman and film producer
Janiva Magness (born 1957), American singer and songwriter
Jodi Magness (born 1956), American biblical scholar